The Ningbo Rockets, or Ningbo Fubang Rockets, competing as Ningbo Yongxing Securities, are a professional basketball team based in Ningbo, Zhejiang. They are currently competing in the Chinese Basketball Association. The team are derived from the dissolved Bayi Rockets.

History
Early in 2006, the Bayi Fubang basketball team were established as a joint venture between Ningbo Fubang Holdings and the Bayi Rockets. In 2018, the two owners parted ways due to military reform for Bayi Rockets' military backgrounds. The Bayi Rockets were able to participate in the CBA league as a special guest team, while Ningbo Fubang Holdings retained a spot for its own team in the league. After the Bayi Rockets dissolved and quitted the league in 2020, Ningbo Fubang applied for acquisition of the team, but was unapproved. 

In 2021, the Ningbo Rockets was founded by Ningbo Fubang Holdings as a new club, but the company claimed its connections with the Bayi Rockets. Li Ke, former player of the Bayi Rockets, was appointed as the head coach.

Players

Current roster

References

External links
 https://www.cbaleague.com/#/match/team/detail/100074683 (in Chinese)

Chinese Basketball Association teams
Sport in Ningbo
Basketball teams established in 2021
2021 establishments in China